Timothy R. Seder (born September 17, 1974) is a former American football placekicker in the National Football League (NFL) for the Dallas Cowboys, Minnesota Vikings, and Jacksonville Jaguars. He played college football at Ashland University.

Early years
Seder attended Ashland High School in Ashland, Ohio. He walked-on at Division II Ashland University. He became a starter at placekicker as a freshman, making 6-of-12 field goals and 28-of-29 extra points for 46 points. He would lead the team in scoring in each of his final three seasons.

As a senior, he recorded 64 points on 14-of-19 field goals and 22-of-24 extra points attempts. His 14 field goals ranked second in school history and earned him All-MIFC honors. He received second-team All-MIFC honors as a center fielder in baseball. He finished his college career with 41 field goals (school record) and 204 career points (fourth in school history).

In 2013, he was inducted into the Ashland University Hall of Fame.

Professional career

Dallas Cowboys
In 2000, although he was out of football for more than two years, teaching and coaching at Lucas High School, he was contacted by the Dallas Cowboys, after they had reviewed his highlight tape and wanted him to have a try-out. At the end of preseason, he won the placekicker job over rookie Rian Lindell.

As a rookie, he led the Cowboys in scoring with 108 points (third in franchise history by a rookie), converting 25 field goals (franchise record for rookies) for a 75.8% and all 27 extra point opportunities. He also had one rush for a touchdown against the Cincinnati Bengals, which was the first one by a kicker in Cowboys history. 

In 2001, he had an eight-yard touchdown run in the fourth game against the Oakland Raiders, although he had 2 field goals attempts blocked. In the fifth game against the Washington Redskins, he scored all Cowboys points including a 26-yard field goal as time expired for a 9-7 win, earning NFC Special Teams Player of the Week honors. In the eighth game against the Atlanta Falcons, he injured his right ankle trying to recover an errant snap from rookie long snapper Randy Chevrier. He was placed on the injured reserve list on November 14. He made 11 out of 17 field goals (64.7%) in the year and was replaced with Jon Hilbert.

On September 1, 2002, he was waived after being passed on the depth chart by rookie Billy Cundiff.

Minnesota Vikings
On September 1, 2002, he was claimed off waivers by the Minnesota Vikings. He was released on September 3, after spending just one day with the team and losing a kicking tryout against Doug Brien.

Jacksonville Jaguars
On October 23, 2002, he signed as a free agent with the Jacksonville Jaguars, to replace a struggling Hayden Epstein. He was cut on November 26, after making 8-of-12 field goals, missing from 40 yards in a 21-24 loss against the Houston Texans and from 41 yards in a 19-21 loss against the Dallas Cowboys. He was replaced with Richie Cunningham.

Columbus Destroyers
On January 11, 2005, he was signed by the Columbus Destroyers of the Arena Football League. He was waived four days later on January 15.

Philadelphia Soul
On March 18, 2005, he signed with the Philadelphia Soul of the Arena Football League. On September 28, he was traded to the Utah Blaze in exchange for Donny Klein.

Utah Blaze
On November 10, 2005, he was traded along with Fred Ray to the Kansas City Brigade in exchange for Hans Olsen.

Kansas City Brigade
On January 8, 2006, he was activated by the Kansas City Brigade. He was released on March 16.

Coaching career
From 1998 to 1999, he coached football, baseball and the freshman basketball team, while also teaching health and physical education at Lucas High School.

In 2003, he was a graduate assistant football coach at Ashland University. In 2005, he was a volunteer assistant football coach at Ohio State University. In 2006, he was a volunteer assistant football coach at West Mesquite High School. In 2013, he became a health teacher and the football defensive coordinator at John Horn High School. On March 22, 2018, he was announced as the head coach at North Mesquite High School.

References

External links
 

1974 births
Living people
American football placekickers
Ashland Eagles baseball players
Ashland Eagles football players
Dallas Cowboys players
Jacksonville Jaguars players
Kansas City Brigade players
Philadelphia Soul players
High school baseball coaches in the United States
High school basketball coaches in Ohio
High school football coaches in Ohio
High school football coaches in Texas
People from Ashland, Ohio
Players of American football from Ohio